Iidle Elmi (born 1 January 1995) is a Somalian born Finnish footballer who last played for FC YPA in the Finnish third tier Kakkonen. He has previously played for FF Jaro in the Finnish top division Veikkausliiga and for FB Gulbene in the Latvian Virsliga.

Career 
Elmi joined the FF Jaro junior squad in 2009. He signed a three-year contract with Jaro's first team in January 2011. In 2015 he was signed by the Latvian side FB Gulbene, but the club was expelled from the top league and their results expunged on suspicion of match-fixing. Elmi returned Finland for the next season.

Sources 
Veikkausliiga
Finnish Football Association

References

External links 
Iidle Elmi Finnish Football Association.

1995 births
Living people
Finnish footballers
Somalian footballers
Veikkausliiga players
Latvian Higher League players
FF Jaro players
FB Gulbene players
Expatriate footballers in Latvia
Finnish expatriate footballers
Finnish expatriate sportspeople in Latvia
Somalian emigrants to Finland
Jakobstads BK players
FC YPA players
Association football forwards